Bunkeflo FF is a Swedish football club located in Bunkeflostrand.

Background
Bunkeflo FF plays in Division 5 Skåne Sydvästra A which is the seventh tier of Swedish football. They play their home matches at Brovallen in Bunkeflostrand.

In 2015 the average attendance was 41 persons. The team won the qualification against Stehag and were promoted to division 5.

Famous players: Robin Olsen (Malmö FF, PAOK FC, Copenhagen FC, AS Roma)

The club is affiliated to Skånes Fotbollförbund.

Footnotes

External links
 Bunkeflo FF – Official website

Football clubs in Skåne County